Friedrich Reinke (11 April 1862 – 12 May 1919) was a German anatomist.  Reinke crystals, Reinke's space and Reinke's edema are named after him.

Childhood
Friedrich was the ninth of ten children born to Mr Theodor Friedrich Julius Reinke (1817-1887)  a Lutheran Pastor, and Mrs Elisabeth Henriette Karoline Gottfriede Juliane Reinke, born Kämpffer (1821-1880).

Education
He was born in Ziethen a small town in the Principality of Ratzeburg and died in Wiesbaden (Hesse-Nassau, Provinces of Prussia). One of his siblings was Johannes Reinke a botanist and philosopher.

Friedrich was educated at home until the age of 14, principally by his father and an aunt. Reinke attended Neustrelitz High School and was later transferred to Große Stadtschule, today referred to as Goethe-Schule, in Rostock in 1882, where he graduated in 1883.

Reinke began his medical studies in 1883 at the University of Goettingen and the University of Kiel received his medical degree on 28 March 1891 with a specialization in anatomy. His doctoral thesis, Untersuchungen über das Verhältnis der von Arnold beschriebenen Kernformen zur Mitose und Amitose (Investigations into the relationship of the nuclear forms described by Arnold to mitosis and amitosis), was an in-depth study of cell division. Upon graduation, Reinke completed a 6-month internship at the Pathology Institute of the University of Zurich. There, he studied under Edwin Klebs. Reinke developed a collegial relationship with Otto Lubarsch, who at that time was an assistant in the Institute. On completion of his internship, Reinke served as a ship's doctor on the passenger liner Weiland bound for Brazil where he visited some members of his family. He returned to Germany in 1893 to complete a second internship as a junior physician in Dahmen, Mecklenburg. Subsequently, Professor Albert von Brunn offered Reinke the position of first demonstrator at the Anatomical Institute of the University of Rostock, perhaps through the intercession of Dr Lubarsch. There he achieved his habilitation, or Venia Legendi, a postdoctoral qualification common to many European academic systems that entitles the holder to supervise doctoral candidates and is thus essential for an academic career. His habilitation thesis, reviewed and defended before committee, was entitled Zellstudien (Cellular Studies), an investigation of the cell structure in the germ layer of the human skin. Specifically, he investigated leukocytes, the cells of the conjunctive tissue, collagenous and elastic fibers, pigment, and cell differentiation.

Personal life
Reinke married Julie Caroline Friederike Auguste von Zülow, the daughter of an imperial postmaster on 12 August 1902. Not wealthy in his own right, Reinke may have acquired some means through marriage, as he was able to renounce his salary during a subsequent professional disagreement. On 21 May 1904 Friedrich and Auguste gave birth to their only child, Hans Gebhard Reinke, who eventually became a theologian like his grandfather.

Professional life
On 1 April 1893 Reinke assumed his first academic position as first demonstrator at the Anatomical Institute in Rostock under the direction of Professor Albert von Brunn. Reinke must have asserted himself professionally, for just 4 months later, in August, Reinke was promoted to extraordinary professor of medicine.

In April 1895, Professor von Brunn suffered a fatal cardiac arrest, and Reinke was appointed interim director of the Anatomical Institute in his place. The first of his two landmark publications in laryngeal anatomy, Untersuchung über das menschliche Stimmband (Investigation into the human vocal fold), in which he described the superior and inferior arcuate lines as the boundaries of the squamous epithelium of the vocal fold, and of the tissue layer which now bears his name, was published in the same year. The origin of his interest in the larynx remains obscure. There exists mention of his being motivated by his interest in the larynx of the birds singing outside his office window.

One year later, in 1896, Dietrich Barfurth (1849–1927), a professor from the University of Dorpat, was appointed full professor and director of the Anatomical Institute, displacing Reinke. Under the circumstances, it is not surprising that Reinke and his successor did not get along. In October 1900, Reinke was further promoted in the medical faculty, which resulted in more animosity between him and Barfurth. Having been interim director himself, Reinke apparently had some difficulty accepting Barfurth's authority and viewed him as a colleague rather than a superior.

Reinke's dispute with Barfurth seems not to have been an isolated event. Reinke was described as impetuous, reckless, and coarse. In addition, outbreaks of abrupt rage were not uncommon if Dr Reinke was contradicted. As mentioned previously, Reinke relinquished his salary during one infamous dispute with Barfurth, which began over Reinke's refusal to prepare some human fetuses as anatomical specimens.

Reinke's second publication concerning the larynx, Über die funktionelle Struktur der menschlichen Stimmlippen mit besonderer Berücksichtigung des elastischen Gewebes (On the functional structure of the human vocal folds with special consideration of the elastic tissue), dates to this contentious period in his life. Besides the superficial lamina propria of the vocal fold, Reinke's other eponym is attached to crystals found in Leydig cells of the human testes and hilar cells of the human ovary. His publications reveal a special interest in cell division, embryology, and cell interactions. One article, Beziehungen des Lymphdruckes zu den Erscheinungen der Regeneration und des Wachstums (Relations of the pressure of the lymph to the phenomena of regeneration and growth), encroaches on topics of Dr Barfurth's special expertise, and perhaps the investigation was undertaken as a challenge to him.

His focus on investigational work at the expense of teaching was to be the final irritant in his relationship with Barfurth. On 1 October 1904 Barfurth suspended Reinke as demonstrator of the Institute of Anatomy for misconduct. Reasons cited in his personnel file include friction with Barfurth, neglect of his teaching responsibilities, refusal to obey instructions, and his free-form approach to holidays and vacations.
 
In 1907, while still maintaining his faculty appointment in medicine at Rostock, Reinke assumed a position as demonstrator at the urban hospital in Wiesbaden under Professor Gotthold Herxheimer. He continued his investigations on cell division and tumor formation and continued to publish extensively. Reinke was finally dismissed from his professorship in Rostock in March 1914 under unclear circumstances, but apparently again as a result of intervention by Barfurth. It is apparent that his professional efforts were invested elsewhere by this time. He went on to oversee the laboratory operations at Dr -Horst-Schmitt-Kliniken while most of his colleagues were on military service during World War I. On 12 May 1919, aged 58, Reinke died of gastric cancer in Paulinen Stift (Paulinen Hospital), a charity institution in Wiesbaden, a circumstance, which strongly suggests that he died in poverty.

Timeline

Gallery

External links

References

German anatomists
1862 births
1919 deaths